Aleksey Pavlenko may refer to:

 Aleksey Pavlenko (skier) (born 1995), Russian freestyle skier
 Oleksiy Pavlenko (born 1977), Ukrainian businessman and politician